

Released songs

As main artist

As featured artist

Unreleased songs

Notes

References

West, Kanye

Lists of unreleased songs by recording artists